Tarkio is an unincorporated community in Montana, United States, located in Mineral County. Tarkio falls in Mountain Time Zone (MST/MDT) and observes daylight saving time.

It lies along Interstate 90 with access via exit 61. The Clark Fork River flows to the west.

References

External links
 Tarkio page from roadsidethoughts.com

Unincorporated communities in Montana
Unincorporated communities in Mineral County, Montana